Ian Martin Buckett (born 23 December 1967 near Holywell in Flintshire) is a former international rugby union front row forward who played for Swansea and London Welsh and played county rugby for North Wales. He was a championship winning player, an international and an academic.

He was a member of the 1992 Oxford University team and attained three full caps for Wales.

He was selected for more televised rugby football games from 1992 to 1995 than any other UK player.

Early International career

Having scored in his Wales Students debut against England in the inaugural Student World Cup in Biarritz, Southern France in 1988 he would go on to earn selection for the Wales under-21 team both for a warm up game in Aldershot and internationally against Scotland. He had made his reputation after some bustling performances for North Wales representative sides including against New Zealand under-21. He was twenty one years old when he first lined up against the All Blacks in 1989.

In 1992 he skippered Wales Students to a junior World Cup competition in Italy where they were knocked out of the tournament by New Zealand Universities losing 12–13 in Sicily. By the time he was twenty five years old, and as a yet uncapped senior player, Ian Buckett had spent 6 months touring Southern and South Africa successfully within a number of international level teams, playing in one loss.

International career

Although rarely used at senior international level he was first capped for Wales against  in Nukuʻalofa in 1994 which was the third of a four test tour and the second and decisive test on the Islands. Included that day were Paul John of Pontypridd and Steve Williams of Neath, all three were members in the unbeaten Wales A team of 1994 including victory over a France XV who had defeated England A that season, in Cardiff.

All three were selected on their return to play against the touring Springbok in 1994, which was lost 25–12 at Rodney Parade, Newport and made the preliminary 41-man RWC squad for 1995.

Ian Buckett had toured several times with the senior side. He had made his first try scoring appearance for a Wales XV in Swakopmund in Namibia in 1990, his second at altitude in Bulawayo, Zimbabwe in 1993 and his last appearance against Ontario in 1997.

He won further caps against the US Eagles in San Francisco in the second and decisive game in the United States of America and against Canada in a one-off test near Toronto completing a hat-trick of test wins in North America. It was generally considered that Welsh rugby was in 'disarray' at the time shortly after the arrival of the professional game and he was a late inclusion to both the tour party and the team due to squad injuries. He had already played in the end of season victory over Romania in Bucharest.

Ian Buckett usually featured in the Wales A team playing in nine games between 1993 and 1998, his final game after making the Autumn Test Series following the end of season North American tour against the touring All Blacks at Sardis Road, Pontypridd. He left the field after 47 minutes, ending a cycle of nine games for the Welsh Rugby Union in six months losing one, and a ten-year representative career.

He also played twice for Wales B against the Netherlands starting over forty representations for Wales at all levels scoring three tries, and a match day squad for a Final Challenge game for the Barbarians against Argentina in Cardiff covering loose head and tight head prop. He was then selected to play in the prestige game within Leicester Tigers.

Injury
In January 1995, whilst a member of the 1995 RWC squad (41-man) he suffered a complete bilateral tear of his left hamstring in a Premier Division game between Cardiff and Swansea in the Arms Park.

Early life
Ian Buckett was a Wales Schools intermediate and senior group rugby international. At the time he also played club rugby for Flint R.F.C. He moved from there to Birkenhead Park F.C., playing both as a colt and as a senior player. He showed promise as a field athlete, winning the Young Athletes in Blackpool as a teenager in the Discus Event throwing 37.47m. He made national and international level in three different sports as a schoolboy and also later participated successfully in a Guinness World Record endurance event for charity. He was a reservist for the Royal Navy for eighteen months from the age of eighteen and spent some time training in Devon, South West England.

He studied English Literature and Ancient History and Civilisation at Swansea University graduating in 1992 and played three years for the university. He was a student when selected for the Barbarian Football Club during their Centenary Season. He took up a Stanley's Scholarship to Oxford University in 1992 and matriculated in University College, Oxford.

Club career
He had made his first appearance for Swansea RFC on 15 October 1988 against Leicester Tigers and made 184 appearances for the club over the next 10 years. He scored the quickest recorded try by a substitute in the Heineken Cup in a game with Wasps Football Club in September 1997. His final game, also that season, would help the Club win their third Welsh Premier Division Title of the 1990s. Including time spent at London Welsh he played over 200 competitive, national level league and cup games in England and Wales, usually starting. He turned down offers to play in both France and in Italy.

Club representative appearances
During his time at Swansea, in addition to representation for the Welsh Rugby Union, the club made several appearances in international and representative matches before the advent of Welsh Regional Rugby, Ian Buckett was selected to start in the following matches:

Trivia Fact
On 2 January 2000 in an English Cup fixture with Exeter he became the only full Welsh rugby international to represent London Welsh Rugby Football Club either side of the Millennium during the 1999/2000 season.

Post rugby
Ian was called to the Bar of England and Wales at Gray's Inn in 2000. After failing to attain a full pupillage award in London he qualified as a solicitor at BPP College of Law, London. He practised law there and was admitted to the City of London Solicitors' Company, and later Leeds. He was chairman of Flint Rugby Football Club in north Wales, where he first began playing rugby union, from 2009 to 2013 after initially joining the management committee in December 2008 as a consultant.

During this period he is listed as holding two directorships with Rygbi Gogledd Cymru CCIC (translated North Wales Rugby), a management company for a development rugby team based in Colwyn Bay which became RGC 1404, for whom he was also a solicitor, and Deeview Consulting. Both companies were prominent in many changes to the sporting landscape in north Wales.

After the near collapse of rugby league venture Crusaders Rugby League in north Wales he, as a Director of Deeview Consulting, and a local businessman were in discussions with the Rugby Football League about a potential RFL franchise to be played out of Colwyn Bay at Championship One level in conjunction with rugby union. The Crusaders were restructured and the venture never took off.

He continued to play locally for a time as an amateur, and also in high-profile testimonial and charitable games.

Personal life
He has one son who was born in Swansea and who has played three seasons of registered rugby football.

References

External links
European Cup records: 
Swansea RFC – official web page: 

1967 births
Living people
Alumni of University College, Oxford
Barbarian F.C. players
Birkenhead Park FC players
London Welsh RFC players
Members of Gray's Inn
Oxford University RFC players
People from Holywell, Flintshire
Rugby union players from Flintshire
Rugby union props
Swansea RFC players
Wales international rugby union players
Welsh rugby union players